Genome Research is a peer-reviewed scientific journal published by Cold Spring Harbor Laboratory Press. Disregarding review journals, Genome Research ranks 2nd in the category 'Genetics and Genomics' after Nature Genetics. The focus of the journal is on research that provides novel insights into the genome biology of all organisms, including advances in genomic medicine. This scope includes genome structure and function, comparative genomics, molecular evolution, genome-scale quantitative and population genetics, proteomics, epigenomics, and systems biology. The journal also features interesting gene discoveries and reports of cutting-edge computational biology and high-throughput biology methodologies. New data in these areas are published as research papers, or methods and resource reports that provide novel information on technologies or tools that will be of interest to a broad readership. The journal was established in 1991 as PCR Methods and Applications and obtained its current title in 1995. According to the Journal Citation Reports, the journal has a 2020 impact factor of 9.043, which peaked in 2014 at 14.630.

References

External links 
 

Genetics journals
Delayed open access journals
Publications established in 1991
Cold Spring Harbor Laboratory Press academic journals
Monthly journals
English-language journals
1991 establishments in New York (state)
Genomics journals